The Warlander is a horse of Baroque type, produced by crossing Friesian horses with horses of a purebred registered Iberian horse breed such as the Andalusian, Lusitano, or Menorquina.  The ideal Warlander combines the Iberian horse's intelligence, facility for collection, flexibility, and powerful hindquarters, with the Friesian's tractability, dramatic leg action, "bone," and strong forequarters.

History
The crossing of Iberian and Friesian-type horses to produce improved cavalry horses has a history going back to at least the sixteenth century,  though the term "Warlander" was coined only in the late twentieth century by the Classical Sporthorse Stud in Western Australia who named the breed after their association with veterinarian Dr Warwick Vale.

Characteristics
Warlander breeders seek to augment the strongest and most desirable qualities of Iberian and Friesian breeds through the genetic heterosis created by combining two purebred lines. Another goal is to address concerns related to inbreeding depression that may exist in progenitor lines as a result of having closed genetic stock. Because of this, significant debate exists over whether a Warlander will only obtain genetic benefit if it is an F1 hybrid.  A crossbred animal is likely to enjoy hybrid vigor and therefore have genetic gains over both of its parents.  However, there is uncertainty over whether an F2 horse - produced by a Warlander-Warlander, Warlander-Andalusian, or Warlander-Friesian pairing - would be likely to suffer from genetic atavism. The statistically tiny number of F2 and subsequent generation Warlander horses bred internationally has meant empirical resolution of this question has not yet been possible.   The Warlander Studbook Society acknowledges that the following genetic defects are known to come from the base breeds of the Warlander and WSS breeders must notify the society if any horses show the following - Cryptorchidism, Monorchidism, Dwarfism, Fallen Crest, Water head/crown head foals (hydrocephalus) and Mesocolic Rente.

Recognition

Although evidence of breeders utilizing an Iberian-Friesian cross dates back 400 years, the Warlander has been a distinctly organized horse breed only since the 1990s.  No breed-specific Warlander organizations are affiliated to the global Universal Equine Life Number (UELN) foundation, although the Bavarian Specialist Breed Registry (Bayerischer Zuchtverband für Kleinpferde und Spezialpferderassen, or BZKS), which does hold a UELN designation for its studbooks, publishes a Warlander breed standard. Warlander supporters are optimistic that this recognition opens the door to formalization of the breed within the European Union system.

References

External links 
Warlander Studbook Society
 International Warlander Society and Registry  is live but may move soon
 Bavarian Specialist Breed Registry
history link

Horse breeds